The 2007–08 Baylor Bears men's basketball team represented the Baylor University in the 2008–09 NCAA Division I men's basketball season. The team's head coach was Scott Drew, who served in his fifth year. The team played its home games at the Ferrell Center in Waco, Texas.

Pre-season

Recruiting

Roster

Schedule 

|-
!colspan=8 style=| Regular season

 

 

|-
!colspan=12 style=| Big 12 tournament

|-
!colspan=12 style=""| NCAA tournament

References 

Baylor
Baylor Bears men's basketball seasons
Baylor